Little World Cup may describe several tournaments in association football or derived sports:

 Pequeña Copa del Mundo de Clubes, held in Venezuela, 1952–75
 Taça das Nações, in Brazil in 1964
 Brazil Independence Cup, or Minicopa, in 1972.
 1980 Mundialito, in Uruguay
 Mundialito (women), 1981–88
 World Cup of Masters, or Mundialito de Seniors, over-35s, 1987–95
 Mundialito de Futebol de Praia, beach soccer, since 1994
 Futsal Mundialito, since 1994
 Tournoi de France (1997)

See also
 Mundialito (disambiguation)
 World Cup (disambiguation)